Malia Nicole Berkely (born February 13, 1998) is an American soccer player who plays as a defender for North Carolina Courage of the National Women's Soccer League (NWSL).

Early life 
Berkely was raised in Hamilton, Ohio, where she attended Father Stephen T. Badin High School.

Collegiate career 
Berkely attended Florida State University where she played for the Seminoles from 2016 to 2020.

Club career

Bordeaux, 2021 
Berkely joined FC Girondins de Bordeaux in January 2021 on an 18-month contract. She appeared in 10 games, scoring one goal.

North Carolina Courage, 2022 
In December 2021, Berkely signed a three-year contract with the North Carolina Courage.

References

External links 

 
 

1998 births
Living people
National Women's Soccer League players
American women's soccer players
Soccer players from Ohio
Women's association football defenders
North Carolina Courage players
Florida State Seminoles women's soccer players
FC Girondins de Bordeaux (women) players
People from Butler County, Ohio
American expatriate sportspeople in France
Expatriate women's footballers in France
American expatriate women's soccer players
Division 1 Féminine players